Timmonsville is a town in Florence County, South Carolina, United States. The population was 2,320 at the 2010 census, an increase of five persons from 2000. It is part of the Florence Metropolitan Statistical Area.

History
Timmonsville was founded in 1854 by John Morgan Timmons, a Baptist minister of French Huguenot ancestry.
 
The Smith-Cannon House was listed on the National Register of Historic Places in 1983.

In 2016 the municipal government passed an ordinance banning people from having sagging pants, with a fine of $600. It is known as Ordinance 543.

Geography
Timmonsville is located at  (34.135, -79.944).

According to the United States Census Bureau, the town has a total area of 2.6 square miles (6.7 km2), all land.

Demographics

As of the census of 2000, there were 2,315 people, 829 households, and 596 families residing in the town. The population density was 896.6 people per square mile (346.4/km2). There were 956 housing units at an average density of 370.2 per square mile (143.1/km2). The racial makeup of the town was 21.94% White, 77.32% Black, 0.39% Native American, 0.09% Asian, 0.04% Pacific Islander, 0.09% from other races, and 0.13% from two or more races. Hispanic or Latino of any race were 0.82% of the population.

There were 829 households, out of which 32.6% had children under the age of 18 living with them, 35.9% were married couples living together, 31.7% had a female householder with no husband present, and 28.0% were non-families. Of all households 24.0% were made up of individuals, and 10.0% had someone living alone who was 65 years of age or older. The average household size was 2.76 and the average family size was 3.27.

In the town, the population was spread out, with 28.3% under the age of 18, 10.5% from 18 to 24, 26.5% from 25 to 44, 21.1% from 45 to 64, and 13.7% who were 65 years of age or older. The median age was 34 years. For every 100 females, there were 79.3 males. For every 100 females age 18 and over, there were 71.1 males.

The median income for a household in the town was $23,514, and the median income for a family was $29,213. Males had a median income of $23,500 versus $16,588 for females. The per capita income for the town was $11,714. About 25.5% of families and 26.6% of the population were below the poverty line, including 34.1% of those under age 18 and 23.1% of those age 65 or over.

Government and infrastructure
In 2012 the police force was disbanded due to lack of funds.  It was revived in 2014, and Gregory Palmer was appointed chief of police. In 2016, Palmer was dismissed by Mayor Darrick Jackson, who had reportedly lost confidence in him.

Economy
The Honda Motor Company manufactures all-terrain vehicles (ATVs) and multi-use SxS (side-by-side) vehicles in Timmonsville.  Manufactured there are Four Trax Recon, Four Trax Foreman, Four Trax Rancher, Four Trax Rincon, Four Trax Rubicon, Sportrax 400EX/250EX, Pioneer 500, Pioneer 700, and the Pioneer 1000.

The Florence Motor Speedway is also located in Timmonsville.  Following the closure of the Myrtle Beach Speedway in the same market, promoters acquired Florence Motor Speedway from the Powell family, moving the entire operation to the .400 mile circuit, built in 1982, where it is an active NASCAR Advance Auto Parts Weekly Series circuit.  Florence hosts the Icebreaker, CARS Tours, and Myrtle Beach 400 big-money events in addition to the regular club racing schedule.

Education
Public education in Timmonsville is administered by Florence County School District 4. The district operates a single campus containing an elementary, middle, and high school facility.

Timmonsville has a public library, a branch of the Florence County Library System.

Notable people
 John Abraham (1978-), NFL player
 Johnny D. Boggs (1962-), Spur Award-winning  author of Westerns
 Melvin Purvis (1903–1960), FBI agent
 J. Willard Ragsdale (1872–1919), U.S. Representative from South Carolina
 Ernest Shahid (1921–2008), Florida real estate developer
 Charles Aurelius Smith (1861–1916), 91st Governor of South Carolina who served for five days
 Cale Yarborough (1939-), 3 time NASCAR Cup Champion and NASCAR Hall of Fame Inductee

See also

 List of towns in South Carolina

References

External links

Towns in Florence County, South Carolina
Towns in South Carolina
Florence, South Carolina metropolitan area